The 1974–75 season was Derby County's 75th in the Football League and their 48th season in the top flight. They won their second league title in four years to qualify for the 1975–76 European Cup.

Season review
Whereas Brian Clough built his 1971–72 Championship winning team on discipline and a solid defence, Dave Mackay's 1974–75 side relied on attacking power to overwhelm its opponents. Midfielder Bruce Rioch bagged 15 goals to finish as the club's top league scorer, and the front three of Kevin Hector, Francis Lee and Roger Davies all contributed 12 or more. In March, Davies scored all the goals in a 5–0 win over Luton Town, becoming the first Derby player to net five times in a match since Hughie Gallacher in 1934. The Rams also put five past Queens Park Rangers and Burnley to finish the season as the league's leading scorers, though such abandon often left the side defensively frail and there were several heavy defeats along the way.

The season started in worrying fashion, with just one win in the club's opening seven fixtures, and despite a brief rally of six wins in 10 between September and November, a 1–0 defeat at Luton just before Christmas 1974 left them in 10th place. However, a run of just three defeats in their last 20 games, which saw them take 30 points from a possible 40, helped Derby surge up the table. A 0–0 draw away to Leicester City on the penultimate Saturday, combined with Ipswich Town drawing at Manchester City a few days later, confirmed the Rams as champions for the second time in four years.

Although domestic cup progress was limited (reaching the third round of the League Cup and the fifth round of the FA Cup), Derby's UEFA Cup debut proved relatively fruitful. A 6–2 aggregate victory over Servette FC was followed by a 4–4 aggregate draw with Atlético Madrid in the Second Round, both ties finishing 2–2. As a result, Derby took part in the club's first ever penalty shootout and overcame their opponents, winning 7–6. However, that was to be as good as it got for the Rams as Velež Mostar were able to overturn a 3–1 first league deficit to win 5–4 on aggregate and reach the quarter-finals.

Peter Daniel won the club's Player of the Season award after stepping in for Roy McFarland, who suffered an Achilles tendon injury whilst on international duty and missed all but the last five matches. Ron Webster became only the fifth player to break 500 appearances for Derby during his appearance in the defeat at Luton, while Colin Boulton broke the club record for goalkeeping appearances during the campaign on his way to a total of 344 appearances for the club. Colin Todd received the PFA Players' Player of the Year award, the only Derby County player ever to do so.

Squad
Substitute appearances indicated in brackets

League table

Results

First Division

Football League Cup

FA Cup

UEFA Cup

References
 Results database from Soccerbase

1974-75
English football clubs 1974–75 season
1974-75